Van Cauter–Magniflex–de Gribaldy was a Belgian professional cycling team that existed in 1972. It was the successor of the Belgium team Hertekamp–Magniflex and the predecessor of the Italian team . It participated in the 1972 Tour de France.

References

Cycling teams based in Belgium
Defunct cycling teams based in Belgium
1972 establishments in Belgium
1972 disestablishments in Belgium
Cycling teams established in 1972
Cycling teams disestablished in 1972